Spokane Portland and Seattle Railway's E-1 class was a class of the only three 4-8-4 locomotives built by the Baldwin Locomotive Works in 1938. The E-1 class "Northerns" were very similar to the A-2 through the A-5 class "Northerns" on the Northern Pacific Railroad built by Baldwin from 1934–1943.
Visually, the locos are near-identical. The only difference is that the Northern Pacific Railroad 4-8-4s burn coal and the 4-8-4s on the Spokane, Portland and Seattle Railroad burn oil (and have a longer, wider range as a result).

Preservation 
There is only one survivor and it is the  first of the class built. No. 700, which was restored in 1990 by, and is currently maintained by, the Pacific Railroad Preservation Association. Nos. 701 and 702 were both scrapped after they were retired. Since mid-2012, and also since No. 700 Back-Strikes,  it resides at the Oregon Rail Heritage Center in Portland, Oregon where the public can view it during the center's opening days. No. 700 is taken on special trips once or twice a year. However, as of April 2021, No. 700 is currently out of service while it undergoes its Federal Railroad Administration (FRA) mandated 1,472-day inspection and overhaul, but is currently expected to return to service again later in 2021.

Roster

References 

E-1
4-8-4 locomotives
Baldwin locomotives
Steam locomotives of the United States
Railway locomotives introduced in 1938
Standard gauge locomotives of the United States